The bullneck seahorse (Hippocampus minotaur) is a pygmy seahorse in the genus Hippocampus. This seahorse has never been found in the wild, and little is known about its natural habitat. The only known specimens were collected on the coast of Eden, Australia. It is thought to live in sand beds at the bottom of the ocean, possibly wrapping its prehensile tail around gorgonian corals. The seahorse is among the 25 “most wanted lost” species that are the focus of Global Wildlife Conservation's “Search for Lost Species” initiative.

Martin F. Gomon produced the first description of Hippocampus minotaur in Memoirs of Museum Victoria in 1997.

References

bullneck seahorse
Fauna of New South Wales
bullneck seahorse
Taxonomy articles created by Polbot